Nyctiphrynus is a genus of nightjar in the family Caprimulgidae.

It contains the following species:
 Eared poorwill (Nyctiphrynus mcleodii)
 Ocellated poorwill (Nyctiphrynus ocellatus)
 Chocó poorwill (Nyctiphrynus rosenbergi)
 Yucatan poorwill (Nyctiphrynus yucatanicus)

 
Bird genera
Higher-level bird taxa restricted to the Neotropics
Taxa named by Charles Lucien Bonaparte
Taxonomy articles created by Polbot